Chapelgate Christian Academy (CCA) is a private Christian school located in Marriottsville, Maryland. It is affiliated with the Presbyterian Church of America.

Chapelgate Christian Academy is a college preparatory school with a Christian worldview. To gain admittance to the school, a student's parent or guardian must agree with Chapelgate's statement of faith, foremost of which is the belief that the Bible is infallible and inerrant.

Its high school athletic programs on the boys' side compete in the Maryland Interscholastic Athletic Association (MIAA), predominantly in the association's MIAA-C conference. Boys' basketball competes in the MIAA-B.

References

External links
 

Christian schools in Maryland
Private high schools in Maryland
Marriottsville, Maryland
Presbyterian Church in America
Presbyterian schools in the United States